Little Prince, also known as The Little Prince, is an outdoor 1995 copper and steel sculpture created by artist Ilan Averbuch, located in the Rose Quarter of Portland, Oregon. It is part of the City of Portland and Multnomah County Public Art Collection, courtesy of the Regional Arts & Culture Council.

Description and history

The copper and steel sculpture of a crown resting on it side was installed in 1995 at the intersection of Northeast Multnomah Street and North Interstate Avenue, south of the Moda Center in Portland's Rose Quarter. Funded by the City of Portland's Percent for Art program, the crown measures  x  x  and is partially buried.

According to the Regional Arts & Culture Council, the agency which administers the sculpture, "It is a piece about imagination, desires and aspirations, conquests and struggles. It is the job of the viewer to create the story that goes along with the crown. Is it a victory and position of honor waiting to be claimed, or is there another story? Only the viewer can say." Save Outdoor Sculpture! suggested, "The crown is resting on its side perhaps waiting as a prize to be claimed or as a symbol of a triumph to come." Averbuch was inspired by Antoine de Saint-Exupéry's novella The Little Prince  (1943), particularly its first chapter where the main character talks about his drawing of a boa constrictor swallowing an elephant being mistaken for a hat.

The sculpture is part of the City of Portland and Multnomah County Public Art Collection courtesy of the Regional Arts & Culture Council.

See also

 1995 in art
 Terra Incognita (sculpture), another 1995 sculpture by Averbuch located in the Rose Quarter

References

Further reading

External links
 Little Prince at ArchiveGrid

1995 establishments in Oregon
1995 sculptures
Copper sculptures in Oregon
Lloyd District, Portland, Oregon
Northeast Portland, Oregon
Outdoor sculptures in Portland, Oregon
Steel sculptures in Oregon
Works based on The Little Prince